Ananda Bandaranayake (born 31 October 1971) is a Sri Lankan former cricketer and cricket coach. He played in 50 first-class matches between 1989/90 and 1998/99.

References

External links
 

1971 births
Living people
Sri Lankan cricketers
Kurunegala Sports Club cricketers
Kurunegala Youth Cricket Club cricketers
Place of birth missing (living people)